Sparrowhawk is an unincorporated community and census-designated place (CDP) in Cherokee County, Oklahoma, United States. The population was 191 as of the 2010 census, at which time the CDP was known as Scraper. The older name of the community was given for Captain Archibald Scraper of the 2nd Regiment, Indian Home Guard. Sparrowhawk takes its name from Sparrow Hawk Mountain, which occupies most of the CDP.

Geography

Demographics

As of the census of 2000, there were 475 people, 189 households, and 137 families residing in the Scraper CDP. The population density was 9.2 people per square mile (3.6/km2). There were 232 housing units at an average density of 4.5/sq mi (1.7/km2). The racial makeup of the CDP was 59.37% White, 1.26% African American, 32.42% Native American, 0.21% Asian, 0.84% from other races, and 5.89% from two or more races. Hispanic or Latino of any race were 1.47% of the population.

There were 189 households, out of which 28.0% had children under the age of 18 living with them, 60.8% were married couples living together, 9.0% had a female householder with no husband present, and 27.5% were non-families. 24.9% of all households were made up of individuals, and 9.0% had someone living alone who was 65 years of age or older. The average household size was 2.51 and the average family size was 2.96.

In the CDP, the population was spread out, with 24.2% under the age of 18, 6.3% from 18 to 24, 24.0% from 25 to 44, 27.4% from 45 to 64, and 18.1% who were 65 years of age or older. The median age was 43 years. For every 100 females, there were 91.5 males. For every 100 females age 18 and over, there were 81.8 males.

The median income for a household in the CDP was $29,018, and the median income for a family was $35,313. Males had a median income of $26,111 versus $24,500 for females. The per capita income for the CDP was $12,770. About 10.9% of families and 13.2% of the population were below the poverty line, including 13.9% of those under age 18 and 9.1% of those age 65 or over.

Notable person
 Wilson Rawls, author of Where the Red Fern Grows and Summer of the Monkeys

References

Further reading
 Shirk, George H.; Oklahoma Place Names; University of Oklahoma Press; Norman, Oklahoma; 1987: .

Census-designated places in Cherokee County, Oklahoma
Census-designated places in Oklahoma